Rawhide may refer to:

Entertainment
Rawhide (1926 film), a Western directed by Richard Thorpe
Rawhide (1938 film), a Western starring baseball player Lou Gehrig
Rawhide (1951 film), a Western starring Tyrone Power and Susan Hayward
Rawhide (TV series), a Western television series featuring Eric Fleming and Clint Eastwood, which ran 1959–1965
"Rawhide" (song), a 1958 Western song originally recorded by Frankie Laine, theme to the TV series
Rawhide, a daily morning satirical show on CBC Radio in the 1950s, with Max Ferguson
"Raw Hide", a song by Ol' Dirty Bastard from his 1995 album Return to the 36 Chambers

Characters
Rawhide Clyde, a character from the animated cartoon Crazy Claws from the 1981 series The Kwicky Koala Show
Rawhide Kid, a fictional cowboy in the Marvel Comics universe introduced in 1955

People
Secret Service codename of President Ronald Reagan
James Douglas, Jr. (1867–1949), known as "Rawhide Jimmy", Canadian-American businessman and mining executive
Jim Tabor (1916-1953), American Major League Baseball player nicknamed "Rawhide"

Places in the United States
Rawhide, California, an unincorporated community
Rawhide, Nevada, a former town
Rawhide, Virginia, an unincorporated community
Rawhide Mountains, Arizona
Rawhide Buttes, Wyoming
Rawhide Creek, Nebraska
Rawhide Mine, a coal mine in Wyoming

Other
Rawhide (computing), a development version of the Fedora computer operating system
Rawhide (material), a hide or animal skin that has not been tanned
VRC-40, a United States Navy fleet logistics support squadron also known as "the Rawhides"
Walla Walla and Columbia River Railroad, also known as the Rawhide Railroad, a defunct railroad in the state of Washington
Visalia Rawhide, an American minor league baseball team
Rawhide Boys Ranch, an at risk youth program provider in New London, Wisconsin, USA